Håkon Austbø (born October 22, 1948) is a Norwegian classical pianist. He has created many recordings for the label Brilliant Classics and Naxos Records, and is also a professor at the Amsterdam conservatory.

Born in Kongsberg, Austbø studied in Paris, New York and Munich, before settling in the Netherlands in 1974.

Austbø's recordings include works by Olivier Messiaen (complete works for piano), Claude Debussy (complete works for piano), Alexander Scriabin (complete piano sonatas), Erik Satie, Johannes Brahms, Robert Schumann, Leoš Janáček (complete works for piano), and Edvard Grieg (complete Lyric Pieces).

Austbø was also an initiator and director of the LUCE project, which was founded to realize Scriabin's Clavier à lumières.

Awards and recognition
In 1971, he received the first prize of the International Competition for contemporary music Olivier Messiaen.
In 1998, he was awarded the Edison Prize for his recording of Messiaen's Catalog of Birds. In 2003, he was awarded the Grieg Prize by the Grieg Museum in Norway.

External links
Home page of Håkon Austbø
Håkon Austbø celebrates 40 years behind the piano on the site of the Music Information Centre (MIC) Norway

Norwegian classical pianists
Living people
Spellemannprisen winners
1948 births
21st-century classical pianists
Musicians from Kongsberg